The Vanya class were a series of minesweepers built for the Soviet Navy between 1960 and 1973. The Soviet designation was Project 257.

Design

The ships were designed as coastal mine hunters. The hulls were built out of wood for significantly reduced magnetic signature. Measures were also taken to reduce electrical and acoustic signature. The propellers were fitted without bubble shields. A more advanced version the Project 257DM was introduced in the mid-1960s. The Project 699 was a version with more powerful diesel engines for towing heavier sweeps.

Ships

A total of 47 units were built by shipyards in Kolpino and Vladivostok (3 Project 699).

Exports

 Bulgaria - 7 ships (1969–1980)
 Syria - 2 ships (1972)

All ships were retired by the mid-1990s

See also
 List of ships of the Soviet Navy
 List of ships of Russia by project number

References

External links
  Russian Vanya Class Minesweepers - Complete Ship List

Mine warfare vessel classes
Minesweepers of the Soviet Navy
 
Minesweepers of the Bulgarian Navy
Minesweepers of the Syrian Navy